Mary Ellen Chase (24 February 1887 – 28 July 1973) was an American educator, teacher, scholar, and author. She is regarded as one of the most important regional New England literary figures of the early twentieth century.

Early life
Chase was born in Blue Hill, Maine; her father was an attorney and her mother a homemaker. Early inspiration to become a writer came from her grandmother's stories of her grandfather's decade as a ship's captain, as well as a meeting at age 10 with novelist Sarah Orne Jewett, who encouraged her.

Career
Chase earned a bachelor's degree from the University of Maine in 1909, then both a master's and Ph.D. in English from the University of Minnesota. During this time, she also taught at schools in Buck's Harbor, Maine, Chicago, and Montana, before serving as an assistant professor at the University of Minnesota from 1922 to 1926. While a student, she was a member of Alpha Omicron Pi. She taught at Smith College starting in 1926 until her retirement in 1955. She was the lifelong companion of Eleanor Duckett, a medieval scholar whom she met at Smith, and with whom she lived in Northampton until her death. Two adjoining residence halls on the Smith campus are named for Chase and Duckett.

Chase wrote more than 30 books, many using her cherished Maine heritage as the setting. Her most famous of these works include Mary Peters, Silas Crockett, Windswept, and Edge of Darkness.

The summer home she lived in from 1941 to 1955, Windswept in Steuben, Maine, was the inspiration for her bestselling book Windswept.  The property was listed on the National Register of Historic Places in 2007.

Awards
In 1956 the Women's National Book Association awarded her the Constance Lindsay Skinner Award.

Death
Chase died in Northampton, Massachusetts.

Bibliography
 His Birthday (1915)
 Studies of Thomas Hardy (1927)
 The Writing of Informal Essays (1928)
 A Goodly Heritage (1932, autobiography)
 Mary Peters (1934)
 Silas Crockett (1935)
 This England (1936)
 Dawn in Lyonesse (1938)
 A Goodly Fellowship (1939, autobiography)
 Windswept (1941)
 The Book of Ruth: from the translation prepared at Cambridge in 1611 for King James (1947) 
 Jonathan Fisher, Maine Parson 1768-1847 (1948)
 The White Gate (1954)
 The Edge of Darkness (1957)
 Donald McKay and the Clipper Ships (1959)
 The Lovely Ambition (1960)
 The Prophets for the Common Reader (1963)
 Abby Aldrich Rockefeller (1966)
 "Life and Language in The Old Testament" (1955)
 "Recipe for a Magic Childhood" (1952) autobiographical

References

External links
 Mary Ellen Chase papers at the Smith College Archives, Smith College Special Collections
 Mary Ellen Chase literary manuscripts at the Mortimer Rare Book Collection, Smith College Special Collections
 
 

1887 births
1973 deaths
20th-century American novelists
Novelists from Maine
Novelists from Massachusetts
Novelists from Minnesota
University of Minnesota College of Liberal Arts alumni
People from Blue Hill, Maine
People from Northampton, Massachusetts
Smith College faculty
University of Minnesota faculty
American women novelists
20th-century American women writers
American women academics